James Johnston Navagh (April 4, 1901 – October 2, 1965) was an American prelate of the Roman Catholic Church. He served as an auxiliary bishop of the Diocese of Raleigh in North Carolina (1952-1957), bishop of the Diocese of Ogdensburg in New York (1957–1963) and bishop of the Diocese of Paterson in New Jersey (1963–1965).

Biography

Early life 
James Navagh was born on April 4, 1901, in Buffalo, New York to George and Catherine Navagh. He earned a Bachelor of Arts degree from Canisius College in Buffalo and a Master of Arts from Niagara University in Lewiston, New York.

Navagh was ordained to the priesthood by Bishop William Turner for the Diocese of Buffalo on December 21, 1929. After his ordination, Navagh served as a curate at Holy Cross Church in Buffalo.  In 1937, he was appointed pastor of Our Lady of Mount Carmel Parish in Brant, New Youk. Navagh was named the first director of the Missionary Apostolate of the diocese in 1939, and served as pastor of St. Joseph's Parish in Fredonia, New York, from 1940 to 1942.

Auxiliary Bishop of Raleigh 
On July 29, 1952, Navagh was appointed as an auxiliary bishop of the Diocese of Raleigh and titular bishop of Ombi by Pope Pius XII. He received his episcopal consecration on September 24, 1952,  from Archbishop Amleto Cicognani, with Bishops Raymond Kearney and James H. Griffiths serving as co-consecrators.

Bishop of Ogdensburg 
Navagh was named the seventh bishop of the Diocese of Ogdensburg by Piux XII on May 8, 1957. He founded Mater Dei College in Ogdensburg in 1960.

Bishop of Paterson 
On February 12, 1963, Pope John XXIII appointed Navagh to succeed James A. McNulty as the fourth bishop of the diocese of Paterson.

James Navagh died on October 2, 1965, from a heart attack in Rome while attending the Second Vatican Council; he was age 64.

References

External links
 Holy Cross Church

1901 births
1965 deaths
Religious leaders from Buffalo, New York
Participants in the Second Vatican Council
Canisius College alumni
Niagara University alumni
Roman Catholic bishops of Ogdensburg
Roman Catholic bishops of Paterson
20th-century Roman Catholic bishops in the United States